Emilio Croci-Torti (6 April 1922 – 2 July 2013) was a Swiss racing cyclist. Professional from 1946 to 1956, He rode in three editions of the Tour de France, seven of the Giro d'Italia and one Vuelta a España.

Major results

1946
 2nd Zurich–Lausanne
 3rd Overall Tour des Trois Lacs
 8th Milan–San Remo
1947
 1st Tour du Lac Léman
 7th Züri-Metzgete
1948
 3rd Road race, National Road Championships
 7th Overall Tour de Romandie
1949
 2nd Road race, National Road Championships
 3rd Trofeo Baracchi
 3rd Tour des Quatre-Cantons
 7th Giro del Ticino
1950
 3rd Tour du Nord-Ouest
 5th Giro della Provincia di reggio Calabria
 9th Milan–San Remo
1952
 1st Stage 8 Tour de Suisse
1954
 1st Stage 2b Tour de Luxembourg
 7th Giro del Ticino

References

External links
 

1922 births
2013 deaths
Swiss male cyclists
Tour de Suisse stage winners